Aconopterus is a genus of longhorn beetles of the subfamily Lamiinae, containing the following species:

 Aconopterus cristatipennis Blanchard in Gay, 1851
 Aconopterus strandi Breuning, 1943

References

Desmiphorini